The national rugby union teams of Scotland and South Africa (the Springboks) have been playing each other in Test rugby since 1906, and as of November 2021, they have met in 28 Test matches. Their first meeting was on 17 November 1906, and was won 6-0 by Scotland and their most recent match was on 13 November 2021, and was won 30-15 by South Africa.

South Africa have won the majority of games played between the two sides, with 23 victories in the 28 matches. They are also the only team to win an away match between the sides, having won 15 times in Scotland. South Africa have won all seven of their home games. Since South Africa's rugby re-admission in 1992, South Africa has dominated once again, winning 18 of the 20 encounters between the two.

The 1906 match between Scotland and South Africa was South Africa's first official international rugby tour. It was also the tour in which the Springbok nickname was coined. South Africa lost to Scotland, defeated Ireland and Wales and drew with England. They also played a game against a representative French side drawn from two Parisian clubs and won.

Summary

Overall

Records
Note: Date shown in brackets indicates when the record was or last set.

Results

List of series

External links
http://www.lassen.co.nz/pickandgo.php

Scotland national rugby union team matches
South Africa national rugby union team matches